Fabulous 30 is a 2014 Taiwanese television series produced by Sanlih E-Television. Starring Vivi Lee, Ling Hung, Albee Huang, Danson Tang, Darren and Hans Chang as the main cast. The Chinese title literally translates to "Woman 30 Love Dancing Water", which is in reference to the three main female characters. Filming took place from January 3, 2014 till May 24, 2014 and was filmed as the drama aired. First original broadcast began February 11, 2014 on SETTV channel airing weekly from Monday till Friday at 8:00-9:00 pm. Final episode was aired on May 27, 2014 with 76 episodes total.

Synopsis
Three friends in their thirties approach love and life differently. Worrywart Xu Wan Ting (Vivi Lee), lives life superstitiously. She was recently dumped by her boyfriend only to find out two month later that he is set to marry someone else. Career minded woman Jiang Wen Qi (Jennifer Hong), is fierce. She and her husband Lu Zhi Yuan (Hans Chang), decide to divorce but lies to their young daughter that she has to be away from home because of long business trips. Then there is their younger friend Xia Zhi Qin (Albee Huang), who is turning thirty soon. She is a free spirit who doesn't seem to want a committed relationship. To get away from everyday life and refresh herself from her recent divorce Wen Qi takes her friends on a getaway trip to Macau for fun and relaxation. At Macau the three ladies meet rich heir Edward Ai De Hua (Danson Tang), who has no plans to settle down and his homely friend Eric Lin Wei Zhong (Darren Qiu) who seems to only worry about his finances.

Cast

Main cast
 as Xu Wan Ting 
 as Jiang Wen Qi 
Albee Huang as Xia Zhi Qin 
Danson Tang as Edward Ai De Hua 
 as Eric Lin Wei Zhong 
 as Lu Zhi Yuan

Supporting cast
Tan Ai-chen as Wu Su Mei 
Pei Hsiao Lan as Xu He Jin Gui 
Elten Ting as Lu Huang Yue Xiang 
Ivy Yin as Ceng Ying Hua 
Hsieh Chi-wen as Li Xiao Xu 
Ivy Shao as Wu Yi Le 
Coke Lee as Xu Han Cheng 
Amanda Liu as Hui Ting 
Kiki Lin as He Xiao Mei 
Angel Ho as Lu Jia Nei
Irene Yang as Eva
Garfield Chung as Xiao Ye 
Chu Lu-hao as Wang Da Qian 
Wasir Chou as Ding Wen Jie

Guest role
 as He Li Jie 
Jeanine Yang as Chen Yi Wen 
Lo Pei An as Mao Ruo Wang
Patrick Lee as Edison 
Irene Luo as herself 
Wang Liang Jing as Feng Zi Qiang
Que Xiao Yu as Xiao Ming 
Yin Zhong Min as Wang Jia Rui 
Lu Yi Lung as Xu Zheng Hong 
Ban Tie Xiang as Ai Da Xiong
Livia Yin as Angel
Grace Ko as Jiang Cai Ling

Soundtrack

Fabulous 30 Original TV Soundtrack (OST) (女人30 情定水舞間 電視原聲帶) was released on May 20, 2014 by various artists under Rock Records (TW) label. It contains 10 tracks total. The opening theme "I'm There Beside You 我在你身旁" by Irene Luo 羅美玲 is not featured on the soundtrack. The closing theme is track 1 "Years Are Like A Sharp Blade 歲月這把刀" by Freya Lim 林凡.

Track listing

The following songs are not featured in the official soundtrack CD release.
I'm There Beside You 我在你身旁 by Irene Luo 羅美玲
I'm There Beside You (Longing version) 我在你身旁 (心情思念版) by Irene Luo 羅美玲
Can't Hold You 套不住 by Freya Lin 林凡 (Feat. Adrian Fu 符致逸)
Don't Understand Loneliness (Sad version) 不懂寂寞 (分離悲傷版) by Irene Luo 羅美玲
Don't Understand Loneliness 不懂寂寞 by Irene Luo 羅美玲
I Don't Wanna Go by Jossie Qiu 裘芝 
Say Loudly I Love You 大聲說愛你 by Jossie Qiu 裘芝 
When I Think Of You 當我想著你的時候 by Mandy Tao 陶嫚曼 
One Take by Adrian Fu 符致逸

Publications
* 3 May 2014 : S-Pop Vol. 16 May 2014 (華流 5月號/2014) - barcode 4717095574632 - Author: Sanlih E-Television 三立電視監製 
For the May 2014 issue of S-Pop magazine, lead actors Danson Tang and Darren Qiu are featured on the cover of the regular edition of the magazine issue.

DVD release
* 20 June 2014 : Fabulous 30 (Part I) (DVD) (Taiwan Version) - DVD All Region - Disc: 5 (Ep.1-36) - Publisher: Horng En Culture Co., Ltd. (TW) 
Official Taiwan version of the drama DVD set part 1 showing episode 1 to 36, comes in original Mandarin language and Chinese subtitles only.
* 8 July 2014 : Fabulous 30 (Part II) (DVD) (Taiwan Version) - DVD All Region - Disc: 5 (Ep.37-76) - Publisher: Horng En Culture Co., Ltd. (TW) 
Official Taiwan version of the drama DVD set part 2 showing episode 37 to 76, comes in original Mandarin language and Chinese subtitles only.
* 27 June 2014 : Fabulous 30 (DVD) (Malaysia Version) - DVD Region 3 - Disc: 19 (Ep.1-76) - Publisher: Multimedia Entertainment SDN. BHD. 
Malaysia version of the drama DVD set contains 19 disc with complete episodes 1 to 76, comes in original Mandarin language with Chinese, English and Malaysian subtitles.

Filming Locations
Fabulous 30 was filmed on location in Taiwan and Macao, China. The opening and closing sequence of the drama was filmed in Macao at the Virtual Aquarium Mermaids at City of Dreams and various tourist attraction in Macao.

Development and casting
On January 2, 2014 the main cast was unveiled at a press conference held on the outer grounds of SETTV headquarters.

Broadcast

Episode ratings

Awards and nominations

References

External links
Fabulous 30 SETTV Website  
Fabulous 30 ETTV Website 

Eastern Television original programming
2014 Taiwanese television series debuts
2014 Taiwanese television series endings
Sanlih E-Television original programming
Taiwanese romance television series
Television shows set in Macau